George Washington Woodruff (February 22, 1864 – March 24, 1934) was an American college football player, rower, coach, teacher, lawyer and politician. He served as the head football coach at the University of Pennsylvania (1892–1901), the University of Illinois at Urbana–Champaign (1903), and Carlisle Indian Industrial School (1905), compiling a career college football record of 142–25–2. Woodruff's Penn teams of 1894, 1895, and 1897 have been recognized as national champions. Woodruff was inducted into the College Football Hall of Fame as a coach in 1963.

Playing career and education

Woodruff graduated from Yale University in 1889, where he was a member of Skull and Bones, and the University of Pennsylvania School of Law where he earned his LL.B. law degree in 1895. His football teammates at Yale included Amos Alonzo Stagg, Pudge Heffelfinger, and Pa Corbin.

Coaching career
At Penn, Woodruff coached Truxtun Hare, Carl Sheldon Williams, John H. Outland, his brother Wylie G. Woodruff, and Charles Gelbert. In his ten years of coaching at Penn, Woodruff compiled a 124–15–2 record while his teams scored 1777 points and only gave up 88. He also coached one year each at the University of Illinois at Urbana–Champaign and Carlisle Indian Industrial School.

Political career
After coaching, Woodruff practiced law and was active in politics as a Republican. His political posts included Finance Clerk in Philadelphia, Pennsylvania Attorney General, federal judge for the territory of Hawaii, chief law officer of the US Forest Service under friend and fellow Yale alumni Gifford Pinchot, Acting Secretary of the Interior under President Theodore Roosevelt.

Head coaching record

Football

Note: Before 1936, national champions were determined by historical research and retroactive ratings and polls.  1894 Poll Results = Penn: Parke H. Davis, Princeton: Houlgate, Yale: Billingsley, Helms, National Championship Foundation, Parke H. Davis1895 Poll Results = Penn: Billingsley, Helms, Houlgate, National Championship Foundation, Parke H. Davis, Yale: Parke H. Davis1897 Poll Results = Penn: Billingsley, Helms, Houlgate, National Championship Foundation, Parke H. Davis, Yale: Parke H. Davis George Woodruff's last game as a coach was the 1905 Carlisle-Army game after which he went to Washington for a government job. Ralph Kinney completed Carlisle's season, going 3–2 over the five games played after Woodruff's departure.

References

External links
 

1864 births
1934 deaths
19th-century players of American football
American football guards
American male rowers
Carlisle Indians football coaches
Illinois Fighting Illini football coaches
Penn Quakers football coaches
Yale Bulldogs football players
Penn Quakers rowing coaches
University of Pennsylvania Law School alumni
Pennsylvania Attorneys General
United States Forest Service officials
College Football Hall of Fame inductees
People from Susquehanna County, Pennsylvania
Players of American football from Pennsylvania